Thomas Carr Howe Jr. (1904-1994) was director of the California Palace of the Legion of Honor and one of the monuments men involved in the recovery of art looted by the Nazis during the Second World War. Howe died on July 12, 1994 in San Francisco, California at the age of 89.  He graduated from Harvard College.

Selected publications
Salt Mines and Castles: The Discovery and Restitution of Looted European Art. Bobbs-Merrill Company, Indianapolis, 1946.

External links

References

1994 deaths
1904 births
United States Army personnel of World War II
United States Army officers
Monuments men
Harvard College alumni